Belhar is a small town in the Western Cape, South Africa and forms part of the Cape Flats area in the City of Cape Town.
It is known for being the place where the Belhar Confession was formulated.

References

Suburbs of Cape Town